Douglas James Wilson (born 1953) is a conservative Reformed and evangelical theologian, pastor at Christ Church in Moscow, Idaho, faculty member at New Saint Andrews College, and author and speaker. Wilson is known for his writing on classical Christian education, Reformed theology, as well as general cultural commentary. His most controversial work is Southern Slavery, As It Was, which he coauthored with Steve Wilkins. He is also featured in the documentary film Collision documenting his debates with anti-theist Christopher Hitchens on their promotional tour for the book Is Christianity Good for the World?.

Biography
Douglas Wilson was born in 1953, and in 1958 his family moved to Annapolis, MD where he spent most of his childhood. 
His father was a full-time evangelist, who worked with the Officers’ Christian Union. His father had become a Christian in the Naval Academy, and worked in Christian literature ministry, both in Annapolis and later in Idaho. Upon high school graduation Wilson enlisted into the submarine service, after which he attended the University of Idaho, where he met his wife, Nancy, whom he married in 1975. They have three children and many grandchildren. His son Nathan Wilson is a bestselling author, and his daughter Rebekah is married to the president of New Saint Andrews College, Ben Merkle.

Career

Wilson co-founded the Reformed cultural and theological journal Credenda/Agenda and has been a contributor to Tabletalk, a magazine published by R. C. Sproul's Ligonier Ministries. He has published a number of books on culture and theology, several children's books, and a collection of poetry.

Wilson has been a prominent advocate for classical Christian education, and he laid out his vision for education in several books and pamphlets, especially in Recovering the Lost Tools of Learning and The Case for Classical Christian Education.  In those writings, he argues that the American public schools are failing to educate their students, and he proposes a Christian approach to education based on the medieval trivium, an approach to education with origins in Classical Antiquity which emphasizes grammar, rhetoric, and logic and advocates a wide exposure to the liberal arts, including classical Western languages such as Latin and Greek. The model has been adopted by a number of Christian private schools and homeschoolers.

Wilson has written on theological subjects and an advocate for Van Tillian presuppositional apologetics and postmillennialism. Letter from a Christian Citizen is Wilson's response to atheist Sam Harris's Letter to a Christian Nation. In May 2007, Wilson debated noted atheist Christopher Hitchens in a six-part series published first in Christianity Today, and subsequently as a book entitled Is Christianity Good for the World? with a foreword by Jonah Goldberg.

Controversies

Federal Vision
Wilson's views on covenant theology have caused some controversy as part of the Federal Vision theology, partly because of its perceived similarity to the New Perspective on Paul, which Wilson does not fully endorse, though he has praised some tenets. The Reformed Presbyterian Church in the United States declared his views on the subject to have "the effect of destroying the Reformed Faith".

Discussions on Slavery
Wilson's most controversial work is considered to be his pamphlet Southern Slavery, As It Was, which he co-wrote with Christian minister J. Steven Wilkins. In it, they wrote that "slavery produced in the South a genuine affection between the races that we believe we can say has never existed in any nation before the War or since." Louis Markos notes that "though the pamphlet condemned racism and said the practice of Southern slavery was unbiblical, critics were troubled that it argued U.S. slavery was more benign than is usually presented in history texts." Some historians, such as Peter H. Wood, Clayborne Carson, and Ira Berlin, condemned the pamphlet's arguments, with Wood calling them "as spurious as Holocaust denial".

In 2004, Wilson held a conference for those who supported his ideas at the University of Idaho. The university published a disclaimer distancing itself from the event, and numerous anti-conference protests took place. Wilson described critical attacks as "abolitionist propaganda". He also has repeatedly denied any racist leanings. He has said his "long war" is not on behalf of white supremacy; rather, Wilson claims to seek restoration of a prior era, during which he says faith and reason seemed at one and when family, church, and community were more powerful than the state.

The Southern Poverty Law Center connects Wilson's views to the Neo-Confederate and Christian Reconstruction movements influenced by R. J. Rushdoony, concluding, "Wilson's theology is in most ways indistinguishable from basic tenets of [Christian] Reconstruction."

Canon Press ceased publication of Southern Slavery, As It Was when it became aware of serious citation errors in 24 passages authored by Wilkins where quotations, some lengthy, from the 1974 book Time on the Cross: The Economics of American Negro Slavery by Robert William Fogel and Stanley L. Engerman were not cited. Robert McKenzie, the history professor who first noticed the citation problems, described the authors as being "sloppy" rather than "malevolent" while also pointing out that he had reached out to Wilson several years earlier. According to the Southern Poverty Law Center, "He described the lifted passages as simply reflecting a citation problem, and attributed the latest uproar to "some of our local Banshees [who] have got wind of all this and raised the cry of plagiarism (between intermittent sobs of outrage)."" Wilson reworked and redacted the arguments and published (without Wilkins) a new set of essays under the name Black & Tan after consulting with historian Eugene Genovese.

Published work

Author
 .
 .
 .
 .
 .
 .
 .
 .
 .
 .
 .
 .
 .
.
 .
 .
 .
 .
 .
 .
 .
 .
 .
 .
 .
 .
 .
 .
 .
 .
 .
 .
 .
 .
 .
 .
 .
 .
 .
 .
 .
 .
 .
 .
 .
 .
 .
 .
 .
 .
 Original edition, 2001, .
 .
 .

Contributor
 .
 .
 .
 .
 .
 .
 .

Footnotes

External links

 .
 .

Living people
American Calvinist and Reformed theologians
American Presbyterian ministers
People from Moscow, Idaho
1953 births
University of Idaho alumni
Critics of atheism
American magazine editors
Editors of Christian publications
20th-century Calvinist and Reformed theologians
21st-century Calvinist and Reformed theologians
New Saint Andrews College faculty
Christian bloggers
20th-century American male writers
American Calvinist and Reformed ministers
American male bloggers
American bloggers
21st-century American male writers
Writers from Idaho
Writers about religion and science
20th-century American writers
Bible commentators
Submariners
United States Navy sailors